Zigetangcuo Lake is a crenogenic meromictic lake in the North Tibetan Plateau. It is located in Nagqu Prefecture, north of Dongqiao. It has an area of 187 square kilometers at an altitude of 4560 meters. It is the meromictic lake with the highest known altitude.

References

Lakes of Tibet
Nagqu
Meromictic lakes